Igapó-Açu River ( is a river of Amazonas state in north-western Brazil.
It is a left tributary of the Madeira River.

The river flows through the Purus-Madeira moist forests ecoregion.

See also
List of rivers of Amazonas

References

Sources

Rivers of Amazonas (Brazilian state)